Lassina Touré (born 18 February 1994) is a Burkinabé footballer who plays for Vitória de Guimarães B.

References

External links
 Goal

1994 births
Living people
Sportspeople from Ouagadougou
Burkinabé footballers
Association football defenders
Segunda Divisão players
Liga Portugal 2 players
G.D. Tourizense players
Vitória S.C. B players
21st-century Burkinabé people